Strabena batesii is a butterfly in the family Nymphalidae. It is found on Madagascar. The habitat consists of forests.

References

Strabena
Butterflies described in 1867
Endemic fauna of Madagascar
Butterflies of Africa
Taxa named by Baron Cajetan von Felder
Taxa named by Rudolf Felder